The 2012 Elections for the Illinois House of Representatives was conducted on Tuesday, November 6, 2012. State Representatives are elected for two-year terms, with the entire House of Representatives up for a vote every two years.  The share of votes remained very similar from the last election, but the Democrats were able to win back several seats, due in part to their  near complete control of the state's redistricting process after the 2010 census, allowing them to win 3/5 of the seats in the House of Representatives (a supermajority in Illinois).

Overview

External links
Illinois State Board of Elections
Illinois General Assembly - Illinois State Representatives, 97th General Assembly

2012 Illinois elections
2012
Illinois House of Representatives